Concepción Oliva Castañeda Ortiz (born 8 December 1952) is a Mexican politician affiliated with the Institutional Revolutionary Party. In 2014 she served as Deputy of the LIX Legislature of the Mexican Congress as a plurinominal representative.

References

1952 births
Living people
People from Veracruz (city)
Women members of the Chamber of Deputies (Mexico)
Members of the Chamber of Deputies (Mexico)
Institutional Revolutionary Party politicians
Politicians from Veracruz
Universidad Veracruzana alumni
21st-century Mexican politicians
21st-century Mexican women politicians
Deputies of the LIX Legislature of Mexico